Sarlanagar is a city near Maihar where the employees of Maihar Cement reside. It is named after Smt. Sarla Birla, wife of Shri B.K. Birla, who owns B.K. Birla Group of companies, which owns Maihar Cement.

It is split into three sections:
 Staff Colony, where the Maihar Cement staff resides
 Workers Colony (Hanthikund Colony), often called Bank Colony due to the branch of UCO Bank opened there
 Mines Colony, where the people of the Mines Division reside

Education 
There are two branches of school split into Hindi Medium and English Medium.

Sarla Higher Secondary. School
It is a co-educational school and it is situated in Madhya Pradesh. The school is affiliated to CBSE BOARD AJMER.

Safety and environment 
Every year safety day is celebrated here, where a huge debates and resolutions about safety is taken. Children write and draw beautiful slogans, picture and articles. People also perform various acts as to spread awareness to the people. at last, a cartoon of impacts of accidents is burnt.

References

External links 
maiharcement.co.in

sarlanagar.blogspot.com

Cities and towns in Satna district